The 1900 Connecticut Aggies football team represented Connecticut Agricultural College, now the University of Connecticut, in the 1900 college football season.  This was the fifth year that the school fielded a football team.  The Aggies were led by second year head coach T. D. Knowles, and completed the season with a record of 4–3–1.

Schedule

References

Connecticut
UConn Huskies football seasons
Connecticut Aggies football